The men's 200 metre backstroke event at the 2014 Commonwealth Games as part of the swimming programme took place on 28 July at the Tollcross International Swimming Centre in Glasgow, Scotland.

The medals were presented by Gregor Tait, the 2006 Commonwealth champion in this event and the quaichs were presented by Stuart Ogg, Director of Corporate Services of Sportscotland.

Records
Prior to this competition, the existing world and Commonwealth Games records were as follows.

Results

Heats

Final

References

External links

Men's 200 metre backstroke
Commonwealth Games